Guzmania globosa is a plant species in the genus Guzmania. This species is native to Ecuador, Colombia, and Peru.

References

globosa
Plants described in 1953
Flora of South America